MacDonald Park is a stadium in Victoria, British Columbia in Canada. It is the home ground for the James Bay Athletic Association Rugby Union team.

Sports venues in Victoria, British Columbia
Rugby union in British Columbia